Beau Hoopman (born October 1, 1980) is an American rower.

Collegiate career
A member of his high school's golf team, Hoopman joined the rowing team at the University of Wisconsin as a walk-on in the fall of 1999. He won the Eastern Sprints both as a member of Wisconsin's freshman eight in 2000, and in the varsity eight in 2002, the latter being Wisconsin's first victory in the event since the inaugural Eastern Sprints in 1946. He was named to the University of Wisconsin-Madison Athletic Hall of Fame in 2014.

International career
Hoopman first competed internationally for the United States in 2001, winning a silver medal at the World Under 23 Rowing Championships in Ottensheim, Austria. He was also a member of the gold medal eight at the 2002 Under 23 championships in Genoa, Italy, and placed 12th in the Men's 4- at the 2002 world championships, his first appearance as a member of the senior national team.

In 2004 Hoopman  was part of the Olympic gold medal-winning Men's 8+ team at the Athens Olympic Games, which also set the M8+ 2000m World Record during a qualifying heat. He was also a member of the bronze medal-winning Men's 8+ team in the 2008 Olympics in Beijing.

Personal life
Hometown: Plymouth, Wisconsin
Current Residence: Madison, WI
High School: Plymouth High School
Undergraduate Education: University of Wisconsin, Biological Aspects of Conservation, 2003
Began Rowing: 2000 - University of Wisconsin
Club Affiliation: USRowing Training Center
Training Location: Princeton, New Jersey
Current Coaches: Mike Teti
Years on National Team: Seven - 2001–02, Under 23; 2003, Pan American Games; 2002–07, Senior
Event (s): Sweep

References

Sportspeople from Sheboygan, Wisconsin
Rowers at the 2004 Summer Olympics
Rowers at the 2008 Summer Olympics
Olympic gold medalists for the United States in rowing
Olympic bronze medalists for the United States in rowing
University of Wisconsin–Madison alumni
1980 births
Living people
American male rowers
Medalists at the 2008 Summer Olympics
Medalists at the 2004 Summer Olympics
Pan American Games medalists in rowing
Pan American Games gold medalists for the United States
Pan American Games silver medalists for the United States
World Rowing Championships medalists for the United States
Rowers at the 2003 Pan American Games
Wisconsin Badgers rowers